A show trial is a public trial in which the judicial authorities have already determined the guilt or innocence of the defendant.  The actual trial has as its only goal the presentation of both the accusation and the verdict to the public so they will serve as both an impressive example and a warning to other would-be dissidents or transgressors.

Show trials tend to be retributive rather than corrective and they are also conducted for propagandistic purposes. When aimed at individuals on the basis of protected classes or characteristics, such trials are examples of political persecution. The term was first recorded in 1928.

China 
During the Land Reform Movement, between 1 and 2 million landlords were executed as counterrevolutionaries during the early years of Communist China. After the Tiananmen Square protests of 1989, show trials were given to "rioters and counter-revolutionaries" involved in the protests and the subsequent military massacre.

Chinese Nobel Peace Prize laureate Liu Xiaobo was given a show trial in 2009. Chinese writer and dissident Ma Jian argued that Gu Kailai, the wife of purged Communist Chinese leader Bo Xilai, was given a show trial in 2012.

After a drop in acquittal rates in the 2000s, in 2014, the Chinese judicial system reached a conviction rate of 90%. In a report to the National People's Congress, Supreme People's Court Justice Zhou Qiang said "The rulings in some cases were not fair... which harmed the interests of the litigants and undermined the credibility of the law."

Japan
Japan has a conviction rate of over 99.8%, even higher than contemporary authoritarian regimes. Various human rights organizations alleged that the high conviction rate is due to the rampant use of conviction solely based on forced confessions, including those that are innocent. Confessions are often obtained after long periods of questioning by police, as those arrested may be held for up to 23 days without trial. During this time the suspect is in detention and is prevented from contacting family or even a lawyer.

Studies have shown that Japanese judges can be penalized if they rule in ways the judicial office dislikes, and thus face biased incentives to convict. Using data on the careers and opinions of 321 Japanese judges, it was found that judges who engage in acquittals experience less rewarding careers.

Prominent cases
In October 2007, the BBC published a feature giving examples and an overview of forced confessions in Japan. In a different case, a man named Hiroshi Yanagihara was convicted in November 2002 of rape and attempted rape after a forced confession and apparent identification by the victim, despite an alibi based on phone records. He was only cleared five years later in October 2007 when the true culprit was arrested for an unrelated crime. These two cases damaged the international credibility of the Japanese police.

The issue of the extremely high conviction rates were brought into international scrutiny once again after the former CEO of Nissan, Carlos Ghosn, was arrested in 2018 over allegations of false accounting. Ghosn subsequently fled Japan on 30 December 2019 while awaiting trial, and brought the very topic up in an interview as to why he had to flee the country – stating he will never have a right to fair trial. In a statement, Ghosn stated that he would "no longer be held hostage by a rigged Japanese justice system where guilt is presumed, discrimination is rampant and basic human rights are denied." At a subsequent press conference, Ghosn added that "I did not escape justice. I fled injustice and persecution, political persecution".

Middle East 
Judiciary in countries such as Bahrain and Saudi Arabia is completely dependent on the wishes and wants of the governing regimes. During their show trials, Human rights activists and opposition figures are routinely given harsh verdicts in predetermined rulings by the kangaroo courts.

Egypt 

The United Nations human rights office and various NGOs expressed "deep alarm" after an Egyptian Minya Criminal Court sentenced 529 people to death in a single hearing on 25 March 2014. The judgment was condemned as a violation of international law. By May 2014, approximately 16,000 people (and as high as more than 40,000 by one independent count) have been imprisoned after the 2013 Egyptian coup d'état in July 2013. Egypt's ousted President Mohamed Morsi was sentenced to death on 16 May 2015, along with 120 others.

Turkey 

After the failed coup attempt in 2016, the government of Turkey blamed the Gülen movement for the coup and authorities have arrested thousands of soldiers and judges. This was followed by the dismissal, detention or suspension of over 160,000 officials.

Soviet Union 

As early as 1922 Lenin advocated staging several "model trials" ("показательный процесс", literally "demonstrative trial", "a process showing an example") in Soviet Russia and Soviet Ukraine.

Show trials became common during Joseph Stalin's political repressions, such as the Moscow Trials of the Great Purge period (1937–38). Such trials paralleled the institution of self-criticism within Communist Party cadres and Soviet society.

The Soviet authorities staged the actual trials meticulously. If defendants refused to "cooperate"—i.e., to admit guilt for their alleged and mostly fabricated crimes—they did not go on public trial, but suffered execution nonetheless. This happened, for example during the prosecution of the so-called , a "party" invented in the late 1920s by the OGPU, which, in particular, assigned the notable economist Alexander Chayanov (1888–1937, arrested in 1930) to it.

Some public evidence of actual events during the Moscow Trials came to the West through the Dewey Commission (1937). After the collapse of the Soviet Union (1991), more information became available. This discredited the New York Times reporter Walter Duranty, who claimed at the time that these trials were actually fair.

Eastern Europe 

Following some dissent within ruling communist parties throughout the Eastern Bloc, especially after the 1948 Tito–Stalin split, several party purges occurred, with several hundred thousand members purged in several countries.  In addition to rank-and-file member purges, prominent communists were purged, with some subjected to public show trials.  These were more likely to be instigated, and sometimes orchestrated, by the Kremlin or even Stalin himself, as he had done in the earlier Moscow Trials.

Such high-ranking party show trials included those of Koçi Xoxe in Albania and Traicho Kostov in Bulgaria, who were purged and arrested. After Kostov was executed, Bulgarian leaders sent Stalin a telegram thanking him for the help. In Romania, Lucrețiu Pătrășcanu, Ana Pauker and Vasile Luca were arrested, with Pătrășcanu being executed. The Soviets generally directed show trial methods throughout the Eastern Bloc, including a procedure in which confessions and evidence from leading witnesses could be extracted by any means, including threatening to torture the witnesses' wives and children. The higher-ranking the party member, generally the more harsh the torture that was inflicted upon him. For the show trial of Hungarian Interior Minister János Kádár, who one year earlier had attempted to force a confession of Rajk in his show trial, regarding "Vladimir" the questioner of Kádár:

The evidence was often not just non-existent but absurd, with Hungarian George Paloczi-Horváth's party interrogators claiming "We knew all the time—we have it here in writing—that you met professor Szentgyörgyi not in Istanbul, but in Constantinople." In another case, the Hungarian ÁVH secret police also condemned another party member as a Nazi accomplice with a document that had been previously displayed in a glass cabinet at the Institute of the Working Class Movement as an example of a Gestapo forgery. The trials themselves were "shows", with each participant having to learn a script and conduct repeated rehearsals before the performance.  In the Slánský trial in Czechoslovakia, when the judge skipped one of the scripted questions, the better-rehearsed Slánský answered the one which should have been asked.

Belarus
As of 2022, court cases in Belarus are often scheduled ten minutes apart from one another and can conclude in as little three minutes, and have been criticized for being "not a court". Consistently from 2016 through 2020, trials resulting in a guilty verdict occurred at a frequency of 99.7% and  99.8%.

Yugoslavia

In 1946, Draža Mihailović and a number of other prominent figures of the Chetnik movement during World War II were tried for high treason and war crimes committed during WWII. The trial opened in the presence of about 60 foreign journalists. Mihailović and ten others were sentenced to death by a firing squad (two in absentia); the others in the process were convicted to penalties ranging from 18 months to 20 years in prison.

In 2015, a Serbian court invalidated Mihailović's conviction. The court held that it had been a Communist political show trial that was controlled by the government. The court concluded that Mihailović had not received a fair trial. Mihailović was, therefore, fully rehabilitated.

Hungary
Stalin's NKVD emissary coordinated with Hungarian General Secretary Mátyás Rákosi and his ÁVH head the way the show trial of Hungarian Minister of Interior László Rajk should go, and he was later executed.

Czechoslovakia
The Rajk trials in Hungary led Moscow to warn Czechoslovakia's parties that enemy agents had penetrated even high into party ranks, and when a puzzled Rudolf Slánský and Klement Gottwald inquired what they could do, Stalin's NKVD agents arrived to help prepare subsequent trials.

First, these trials focused on people outside the Czechoslovak Communist party. General Heliodor Píka was arrested without a warrant in early May 1948 and accused of espionage and high treason, damaging the interests of the Czechoslovak Republic and the Soviet Union, and undermining the ability of the state to defend itself, Píka was not allowed to present a defence, and no witnesses were called. He was sentenced to death and hanged. During the Prague Spring of 1968, Píka's case was reopened at the request of Milan Píka (son of Heliodor) and the elder Píka's lawyer, and a military tribunal declared Heliodor Píka innocent of all charges.

Milada Horáková, a Czech politician focused on social issues and women's rights, who was jailed during the German occupation for her political activity, was accused of leading a conspiracy to commit treason and espionage at the behest of the United States, Great Britain, France and Yugoslavia. Evidence of the alleged conspiracy included Horáková's presence at a meeting of political figures from the National Socialist, Social Democrat and People's parties, in September 1948, held to discuss their response to the new political situation in Czechoslovakia. She was also accused of maintaining contacts with Czechoslovak political figures in exile in the West. The trial of Horáková and twelve of her colleagues began on 31 May 1950 and he State's prosecutors were led by Dr. Josef Urválek and included Ludmila Brožová-Polednová. The trial proceedings were carefully orchestrated with confessions of guilt secured from the accused, though a recording of the event, discovered in 2005, revealed Horáková's defence of her political ideals. Horáková was sentenced to death, along with three co-defendants (Jan Buchal, Oldřich Pecl, and Záviš Kalandra), on 8 June 1950. Many prominent figures in the West, notably Albert Einstein, Winston Churchill and Eleanor Roosevelt, petitioned for her life, but the sentences were confirmed. She was executed by hanging in Prague's Pankrác Prison on 27 June 1950.

The trials then turned to the communist party itself (Slánský trial). In November 1952 Rudolf Slánský and 13 other high-ranking Communist bureaucrats (Bedřich Geminder, Ludvík Frejka, Josef Frank, Vladimír Clementis, Bedřich Reicin, Karel Šváb, Rudolf Margolius, Otto Šling, André Simone, Artur London, Vavro Hajdů and Evžen Löbl), 10 of whom were Jews, were arrested and charged with being Titoists and Zionists, official USSR rhetoric having turned against Zionism. Party rhetoric asserted that Slánský was spying as part of an international western capitalist conspiracy to undermine socialism and that punishing him would avenge the Nazi murders of Czech communists Jan Šverma and Julius Fučík during World War II. The trial of the 14 national leaders began on 20 November 1952, in the Senate of the State Court, with the prosecutor being Josef Urválek. It lasted eight days. It was notable for its strong anti-Semitic overtones. All were found guilty, with three being sentenced to life imprisonment while the rest were sentenced to death. Slánský was hanged at Pankrác Prison on 3 December 1952. His body was cremated and the ashes were scattered on an icy road outside of Prague.

Romania

As the end of the 1989 Romanian Revolution neared, General Secretary of the Communist Party Nicolae Ceaușescu and his wife Elena were condemned to death and executed by firing squad after a Stalinist-style trial in a kangaroo court.

Western Europe 
The Cadaver Synod was the posthumous trial of Pope Formosus held in 897.
The Dreyfus affair was a show trial in the French Third Republic in 1894, where a Jewish captain, Alfred Dreyfus, was accused and convicted of spying for the German Empire and was imprisoned in Devil's Island in French Guiana, where he spent nearly five years.

Nazi Germany 

Between 1933 and 1945, Nazi Germany established a large number of Sondergerichte that were frequently used to prosecute those hostile to the regime. The People's Court was a kangaroo court established in 1934 to handle political crimes after several of the defendants at the Reichstag fire Trial were acquitted. Between 1933 and 1945, an estimated 12,000 Germans were killed on the orders of the "special courts" set up by the Nazi regime.

South America

Brazil

The trial of former president Luiz Inácio Lula da Silva was marred by allegations of lack of impartiality and political bias due to proximity of the trial and Lula's arrest to the 2018 Brazilian general election.
Federal judge Sergio Moro, who would later become minister of justice in during the early stage of Jair Bolsonaro's presidency, was frequently accused of speeding up corruption charges against Lula in a clear attempt at preventing Lula from running to office again and harm public trust on the Workers' Party. In early 2019, news website The Intercept published leaked messages from Telegram that confirmed the political bias allegations and Moro's speeding up of charges against Lula with the clear intent at preventing him from running for office in 2018.
In 2019 Lula was released from prison after a Supreme Federal Court ruling that declared that defendants could only be arrested after all appeals to higher courts were exhausted.

In 2021 Lula was acquitted of most charges after Supreme Federal Court judges confirmed that Lula's trial was unfair and politically biased.

Nevertheless, there are still ongoing investigations to establish corruption and money bribery charges, linked to Odebrecht Case.

See also

 1301 trial of Bernard Saisset, Paris. 
 1415 trial of Jan Hus, Konstanz 
 1431 trial of Joan of Arc, Rouen 
 1649 trial of Charles I of England
 1792 trial of Louis XVI during the French Revolution
 1894 Trial of the Thirty, Paris
 1927 Trial and execution of Sacco and Vanzetti, Massachusetts
 1946 Trial of Mihailović et al and execution, Belgrade
 1948 trial and execution of Shafiq Ades, Iraq
 1953 Stalinist show trial of the Kraków Curia, Poland
 1981 trial of the Gang of Four in China
 1984 televised trial and execution of Al-Sadek Hamed Al-Shuwehdy in Libya
 1989 Trial of Nicolae and Elena Ceaușescu and execution
 2009 Iran poll protests trial of over 140 defendants
 The Trial of Saddam Hussein
 2013 trial of the Jang Song-thaek in North Korea
 Eastern Bloc politics
 NKVD troika, sentencing by extrajudicial commission
 Political trial, a criminal trial with political implications.
 Posthumous trial
 Victor's justice, prosecution of the defeated party's acts in a conflict by the victorious party, typically in public tribunal
 Witch-hunt, hunting down people of a certain race/trait/profession/political conviction for doing or saying something sinful

Notes

References

 Hodos, George H. Show Trials: Stalinist Purges in Eastern Europe, 1948–1954. New York, Westport (Conn.), and London: Praeger, 1987.
 Showtrials Website  of the European Union
 Balázs Szalontai, Show trials. In: Ruud van Dijk et al. (eds.), Encyclopedia of the Cold War (London and New York: Routledge, 2008), pp. 783–786. Downloadable at academia.edu

External links

1920s neologisms
Informal legal terminology
Types of trials
Propaganda techniques
Abuse of the legal system
Trials of political people